Ruth Carol Taylor (born December 27, 1931) is the first African-American flight attendant in the United States. Her first flight was aboard a Mohawk Airlines flight from Ithaca to New York City.

Early life 
Born in Boston, Massachusetts, into a family of Black, white, and Cherokee heritage. Her mother was Ruth Irene Powell Taylor, a nurse, and her father was William Edison Taylor, a barber. When Ruth was young, her family moved to a farm in upstate New York.

Taylor attended Elmira College and graduated as a registered nurse from the Bellevue School of Nursing in New York City.

Career 
Hired in December 1957, on February 11, 1958, Taylor was the flight attendant on a Mohawk Airlines flight from Ithaca to New York, the first time such a position had been held by an African American. She was let go within six months as a result of Mohawk's then-common marriage ban.

Taylor was later significantly involved in covering the 1963 March on Washington and as an activist for consumer affairs and women's rights. She wrote The Little Black Book: Black Male Survival in America (1985), whose purpose is to "save lives - the lives of Black African Males who are on the Endangered list" in view of the endemic racism in the United States towards African-Americans.

In 2008, 50 years after her historic flight, her accomplishments were formally recognized by the New York State Assembly.

External links 

 Woman's Day: 30 Iconic Photos of Flight Attendants Through The Decades
 Smithsonian Air and Space Museum: Air Travel and Segregation
Insider: Take a photo tour of all the ways being a flight attendant has changed in the last 50 years
NBC: Fly Girls: One of The First Black Flight Attendants Tells All

References

1931 births
Living people
African-American activists
American nurses
American women nurses
Elmira College alumni
Flight attendants
People from Boston
20th-century African-American women
21st-century African-American people
21st-century African-American women
African-American nurses